Bobby Noble may refer to:

 Bobby Noble (academic),  scholar of transgender studies
 Bobby Noble (footballer, born 1945), English footballer
 Bobby Noble (footballer, born 1949) (1949–2005), English footballer

See also
Bob Noble (disambiguation)
Robert Noble (disambiguation)